Kitphom Bunsan (born November 29, 1993), simply known as Dew, is a Thai professional footballer who plays as a left back for Thai League 1 club Muangthong United.

Honours

Club
Buriram United
 Kor Royal Cup: 2015

Ubon UMT United
 Regional League Division 2: 2015

References

External links
 Profile at Goal

1993 births
Living people
Kitphom Bunsan
Kitphom Bunsan
Association football defenders
Kitphom Bunsan
Kitphom Bunsan
Kitphom Bunsan
Kitphom Bunsan
Kitphom Bunsan